Xylophanes bilineata is a moth of the  family Sphingidae. It is known from Peru.

The wingspan is 74–78 mm. It is similar to Xylophanes fassli, but oval patch distal to the discal spot is smaller and darker green.
The forewings are dull grey-green. The cell spot has the form of a large black dot followed by a small slightly darker area. The hindwings are grey-black with a faint orangey-cream band and a narrow dark green outer margin. The fringes are white with some dark intrusions along the veins.

Adults are probably on wing year-round.

The larvae possibly feed on Psychotria panamensis, Psychotria nervosa and Pavonia guanacastensis.

References

bilineata
Moths described in 1928
Endemic fauna of Peru
Moths of South America